Magic Pixel Games is an American video game development company founded by key members of the Boom Blox team from Electronic Arts' Los Angeles studio.

History
Magic Pixel Games was founded by six members of the Boom Blox team after "routine layoffs" from Electronic Arts' Los Angeles studio in March 2010. The company announced its formation on June 2, 2011, after adding other industry veterans from THQ and Activision to its staff.

Magic Pixel's first title, Carnival Island, was announced three days later at the Electronic Entertainment Expo 2011, based heavily on the team's prior experience with motion-controlled games.

Magic Pixel's first mobile title, Stick to It, was a character-based physics-puzzler released in 2012 for iOS.  In 2014, Magic Pixel partnered with Tapzen and released This Means WAR! for iOS, with the Android version coming out in Q3 of 2014.  Also coming out in 2014 is Outcast Odyssey, published by Bandai Namco Games.

On January 12, 2015, both TapZen and Magic Pixel Games were acquired by Kabam.

Games

References

External links
 Official homepage

Video game companies established in 2010
Video game companies of the United States
Video game development companies
Privately held companies based in California